The 1974 Ohio State Buckeyes football team was an American football team that represented the Ohio State University in the 1974 Big Ten Conference football season. The Buckeyes compiled a 10–2 record, including the 1975 Rose Bowl in Pasadena, California, where they lost, 18–17, to the  USC Trojans.

1974 was the first season in which Ohio State played an 11-game regular season schedule. The NCAA allowed teams to schedule 11 regular season games beginning in 1970, but the Buckeyes played only nine regular season games in 1970, their last nine-game regular season. Ohio State played 10 regular season games in 1971, '72 and '73.

Schedule

Roster

Depth chart

Coaching staff
 Woody Hayes – head coach (24th year)
 George Chaump – offensive coordinator (7th year)
 George Hill – defensive coordinator (4th year)
 Joe Bugel – offensive guards (1st year)
 Charles Clausen – defensive line (4th year)
 Mickey Jackson – (1st year)
 John Mummey – quarterbacks (6th year)
 Ralph Staub – tackles, tight ends (5th year)
 Dick Walker – defensive backs (6th year)
 Blair Conway – place kicker, punter (1st year)
 Jeff Kaplan - director of counseling, 'brain coach' (2nd year)

Season summary

at Minnesota

Archie Griffin sets school career rushing record

Oregon State

SMU

Washington State

Wisconsin

Indiana

Northwestern

Illinois

Michigan State
Ohio State fans still insist that Brian Baschnagel scored from one yard out on the final play at Michigan State on November 9. The game officials ruled otherwise, and the Buckeyes suffered a 16-13 loss that cost them the no.1 ranking. Ohio State entered the game at 8-0 and the Spartans were 4-3-1. The frantic, final play occurred after Champ Henson was stopped within inches of the goal line with 13 seconds remaining. Ohio State was out of timeouts, and Michigan State's players were slow getting off the pile. The Buckeyes scrambled and snapped the ball, but it went through QB Cornelius Greene's legs. Baschnagel picked it up and ran into the end zone. Head linesman Ed Scheck signaled touchdown, but field judge Robert Dagenhardt ruled that time had run out before the play began. Fans of each school climbed atop the goalposts, uncertain which team had won. 46 minutes later, with about 40,000 of the 78,533 fans still in the stadium, the public address announcer told the half-empty stadium that Big Ten commissioner Wayne Duke had decided the officials were correct in ruling that time has expired. Referee Gene Calhoun also said the Buckeyes would have been penalized if time had not run out because they didn't come to a one-second set before the snap of the ball.

Iowa

Michigan

Rose Bowl

Awards and honors
 Archie Griffin, Heisman Trophy

1975 NFL draftees

References

External links
 Game program: Ohio State vs. Washington State at Seattle – October 5, 1974

Ohio State
Ohio State Buckeyes football seasons
Big Ten Conference football champion seasons
Ohio State Buckeyes football